Sir Geofroy William Tory,  (31 July 1912 – 18 July 2012) was a British diplomat.

Biography 
The son of William Frank Tory and Edith Wreghitt, Tory was educated at King Edward VII School, Sheffield and Queens’ College, Cambridge, where he took a Double First in French and German and was a contemporary of Donald Maclean. He joined the Dominions Office in 1935, and served as the Private Secretary to Sir Edward Harding, Permanent Under-Secretaries of State for Dominion Affairs, during 1938–39.

In 1957, Tory was appointed as the first British High Commissioner to Malaya, serving there until 1963. Based in Kuala Lumpur, he wrote to Saville Garner in October 1962 about Tunku Abdul Rahman's views post-Malayan emergency.  Tunku believed that there was a Communist conspiracy in Singapore, and Tory wrote that "our Security Service shares his view."

Between 1964 and 1967 he was the British Ambassador to Ireland, before serving as the High Commissioner of the United Kingdom to Malta between 1967 and 1970. In retirement he settled in Ireland.

Tory was appointed CMG in 1956 and KCMG in 1958. He was appointed honorary Commander of the Order of the Defender of the Realm of Malaysia in 1963.

Honours

United Kingdom
 
 Companion of the Order of St Michael and St George (CMG) (1956)
 Knight Commander of the Order of St Michael and St George (KCMG) - Sir (1958)

Foreign honours
  : 
 Honorary Commander of the Order of the Defender of the Realm (P.M.N. (K)) - Tan Sri (1963)

References

External links 

 

1912 births
2012 deaths
People educated at King Edward VII School, Sheffield
Alumni of Queens' College, Cambridge
Knights Commander of the Order of St Michael and St George
High Commissioners of the United Kingdom to Malaysia
Ambassadors of the United Kingdom to Ireland
High Commissioners of the United Kingdom to Malta
Private secretaries in the British Civil Service
Companions of the Order of St Michael and St George
Honorary Commanders of the Order of the Defender of the Realm